The San Fernando Valley Symphony Orchestra is a professional orchestra based out of the San Fernando Valley in California. The orchestra has been in existence for over 30 years and conducted by Maestro James Domine. The orchestra performs in venues across the Los Angeles area including the Thousand Oaks Civic Arts Plaza and the Performing Arts Center at Los Angeles Pierce College.

Past soloists include Ruth Bruegger, Nancy Roth, Daniel Grab, Jennifer Bliman, and Ernest W. Carbajal.

References

External links
 

Orchestras based in California
Music of Los Angeles